Mirna Cecilia Rincón Vargas (born 22 February 1959) is a Mexican politician affiliated with the National Action Party. As of 2014 she served as Deputy of the LX Legislature of the Mexican Congress representing Baja California.

References

1959 births
Living people
Women members of the Chamber of Deputies (Mexico)
National Action Party (Mexico) politicians
Politicians from Tijuana
21st-century Mexican politicians
21st-century Mexican women politicians
Deputies of the LX Legislature of Mexico
Members of the Chamber of Deputies (Mexico) for Baja California